Class 70 may refer to:
Rail vehicles:
United Kingdom :
British Rail Class 70 (electric), electric locomotives built by the Southern Railway in the 1940s
British Rail Class 70 (diesel), diesel locomotives built by GE Transportation in the 2000s
Germany:
 DRG Class 70, a class of German passenger locomotive with a 2-4-0T wheel arrangement operated by the Deutsche Reichsbahn and comprising the:
 DRG Class 70.0: Bavarian Pt 2/3
 DRG Class 70.1: Baden I g
 DRG Class 70.2: ELE T 4
 DR Class 70.61, DR Class 70.63 and DR Class 70.64 : locomotives taken over by the Deutsche Reichsbahn (GDR) in East Germany in 1949
 DRG Class 70.71: Bavarian D IX